Kamilla Ralifovna Gainetdinova (born 12 October 1997) is a Russian pair skater. With former partner Ivan Bich, she is the 2013 JGP Belarus champion and a two-time (2012, 2013) Russian junior national bronze medalist.

Personal life 
Kamilla Ralifovna Gainetdinova was born 12 October 1997 in Moscow, Russia. She is of Tatar descent.

Career

Gainetdinova initially trained as a singles skater, coached by Marina Kudriavtseva in Moscow.

Partnership with Bich
Deciding to switch to pair skating, she formed a partnership in May 2011 with Ivan Bich, who was also new to the discipline. Gainetdinova moved to Saint Petersburg to train with him. They were coached by Oksana Kazakova in their first two seasons together. 

Gainetdinova/Bich made their international debut at the 2011 Warsaw Cup, winning the junior bronze medal. They won bronze at the 2012 Russian Junior Championships. In the free skate, Gainetdinova/Bich landed SBS 3Lz, receiving 6.70 points for the element. They also included a SBS 3Lo+2A sequence after the halfway point, receiving 5.99 points due to some negative grades of execution. They were assigned to the 2012 World Junior Championships, where they finished 11th.

In their second season, Gainetdinova/Bich debuted on the ISU Junior Grand Prix series. They were 7th at their first event in Lake Placid, New York. At the 2012 JGP Croatia, they landed a SBS 3LZ+2T combination in the free skate, as well as upgrading their twist to a triple for the first time. They are the first pair to land the combination in a junior competition. Gainetdinova/Bich finished 4th at the event. They won bronze at the 2013 Russian Junior Championships with a free skate that included a SBS 3Lz+2T combination at the start of the program and SBS 3T after the halfway mark. They finished 8th at the 2013 World Junior Championships.

In spring 2013, Gainetdinova/Bich moved to Moscow and joined Natalia Pavlova and Artur Dmitriev. Beginning their third season with gold at the 2013 JGP Belarus, the pair then won the bronze medal at the 2013 JGP Czech Republic. Their results qualified them to the JGP Final in Fukuoka, Japan. At the final, Gainetdinova/Bich placed sixth in both segments and overall. Their partnership ended in early 2014.

Partnership with Alexeev
Upon hearing that she was without a partner, Stanislav Morozov invited Gainetdinova to join his group and paired her with Sergei Alexeev, in around May 2014. In early September, Gainetdinova/Alexeev won the bronze medal at their first 2014–15 JGP assignment, in Ostrava, Czech Republic. They took silver in Tallinn, Estonia and qualified for the 2014–15 JGP Final in Barcelona.

Programs

With Alexeev

With Bich

Competitive highlights

With Alexeev

With Bich

References

External links 

 
 

Russian female pair skaters
1997 births
Living people
Figure skaters from Moscow
Tatar people of Russia